The Joint Brothers or Les Frères Pétard  is a French film directed by Hervé Palud released in 1986.

Cast 

 Gérard Lanvin : Manu
 Jacques Villeret : Momo
 Josiane Balasko : Aline
 Valérie Mairesse : Brigitte
 Daniel Russo : Harky
 Thomas M. Pollard : Sammy Le Black
 Patrice Valota : Teuch
 Alain Pacadis : la balance
 Cheik Doukouré : Razzo
 Michel Galabru : Monsieur Jabert
 Philippe Khorsand : un flic 
 Dominique Lavanant : la policière
 René Duclos : Nanard
 Norbert Letheule : Aldo
 Smaïn : un petit trafiquant dans le train
 Tina Aumont : la fêtarde déguisée
 Guy Cuevas : l'égyptien

References

External links 
 
 

1986 films
1980s French-language films
1986 comedy films
French comedy films
French films about cannabis
Films set in the 1990s
Stoner films
Films directed by Hervé Palud
1980s French films